She Knows Y'Know is a 1962 black and white British comedy film directed by Montgomery Tully and starring comedienne Hylda Baker. The film takes its title from Hylda Baker's best known catch-phrase. The BFI describes the film, which was made on a low-budget, as a "low life comedy, unfolded against an industrial town backdrop".

Plot
In the North of England in the 1950s, the lives of two very different families become entwined. The Worswicks are a working class family led by domineering mother Hylda (Hylda Baker) with husband Joe (Cyril Smith) and academically bright son Leslie (Peter Myers). Neighbours the Smallhopes are aspiring middle class, led by mother Euphemia (Joan Sanderson), husband Clarence (Neil Wilson), with attractive daughter Marilyn (Linda Castle), whose sudden pregnancy is the catalyst for unfolding dramas involving both families.

Cast

 Hylda Baker as Hylda Worswick
 Cyril Smith as Joe Worswick
 Joe Gibbons as Charlie Todger
 Peter Myers as Leslie Worswick
 Linda Castle as Marilyn Smallhope
 Tim Connor as Terry Roy
 Neil Wilson as Clarence Smallhope
 Joan Sanderson as Euphemia Smallhope
 Alfred Burke as Mr Fox
 Lucy Griffiths as Jenny Higginbottom
 Leonard Sachs as John Dawson
 Patricia Shakesby as Valerie

Critical reception
More recent reception, of the DVD re-issue, has been mixed.
TV Guide described it as a "mindless sex comedy...Typical ribald British innuendoes abound."
AllMovie described it as a "lively British sex farce."

Restoration
In an article in the Blackpool Gazette, Jacqui Morley wrote about the film restoration by Eurwyn Jones:

References

External links

1962 films
1962 comedy films
British comedy films
British black-and-white films
British independent films
Films directed by Montgomery Tully
Films scored by Ken Thorne
1960s English-language films
1960s British films